Lower Covered Bridge can refer to

Maple Street Covered Bridge in Fairfax, Vermont
Montgomery Covered Bridge in Waterville, Vermont